The SEIU Local 660 was a local union of the Service Employees International Union in the United States. It represented 50,000 Los Angeles County employees. It later merged with Local 721.

External links
Official site

Service Employees International Union
Trade unions in California
Organizations based in Los Angeles